Aspasius (c. 80 – c. 150 AD) was a Peripatetic philosopher. Boethius, who frequently refers to his works, says that Aspasius wrote commentaries on most of the works of Aristotle.

The following commentaries are expressly mentioned: on De Interpretatione, the Physica, Metaphysica, Categoriae, and the Nicomachean Ethics. A portion of the commentary on the Nicomachean Ethics (books 1, 2, 4, 7, and 8) is extant. The Greek text of this commentary has been published as Commentaria in Aristotelem Graeca (CAG) vol. 19.1, and David Konstan has published an English translation. It is notable as the earliest extant commentary on any of Aristotle's works. From Porphyry, who also states that Aspasius wrote commentaries on Plato, we learn that his commentaries on Aristotle were used in the school of Plotinus.

Albert the Great, in his commentary on Aristotle's Politics also refers to a monograph on natural affections (Libellus de naturalibus passionibus), as written by Aspasius.

References

Further reading

 Antonina Alberti and Robert W. Sharples, eds., Aspasius: The Earliest Extant Commentary on Aristotle's Ethics (de Gruyter, 1999) 

80 births
150 deaths
2nd-century philosophers
Ancient Greek writers
Commentators on Aristotle
Commentators on Plato
Roman-era Greeks
Roman-era Peripatetic philosophers